Ethminolia degregorii is a species of sea snail, a marine gastropod mollusk in the family Trochidae, the top snails.

Description
The height of the shell attains 2 mm, its diameter 3 mm. The very fragile, umbilicate shell has a subdiscoidal shape and is delphinuliform. The depressed spire is conoidal and obtuse. The five whorls are spirally finely striate, in the middle slightly angled or subcarinate, and flattened between the carina and the suture. The carina is slightly crenulated on the body whorl posteriorly. The body whorl is rounded at the periphery. The convex base is deeply and broadly umbilicated and very finely corrugated. The simple aperture is elliptical and heliciform. The surface of the spire is ornamented with five reddish zones alternating with white punctate with rosy. The surface of the base of the body whorl is ornamented with regularly radiating costiform white maculations.

Distribution
This species occurs in the Red Sea, the Gulf of Oman, the Arabian Sea and off Kuwait.

References

External links
 To World Register of Marine Species
 Illustrated Atlas of the Zoobenthos of Kuwait
 Zuschin, Janssen, Baal - Gastropods and their habitats from the northern Red Sea, Part I Patellogastropoda, Vetigastropoda, Cycloneritimorpha.pdf Ann. Naturhist. Mus. Wien 111 A  73-158, Wien April 2009

degregorii
Gastropods described in 1888